Randall–Selitto test, a technique for the measurement of the pain response in animals
 Carlo Sellitto, an Italian painter of the Baroque period
 Giuseppe Sellitto, an Italian composer